Neurotensin receptor type 1 is a protein that in humans is encoded by the NTSR1 gene. For a crystal structure of NTS1, see pdb code 4GRV. In addition, high-resolution crystal structures have been determined in complex with the peptide full agonist NTS8-13, the non-peptide full agonist SRI-9829, the partial agonist RTI-3a, and the antagonists / inverse agonists SR48692 and SR142948A, as well as in the ligand-free apo state., see PDB codes 6YVR (NTSR1-H4X:NTS8–13), 6Z4V (NTSR1-H4bmX:NTS8–13), 6Z8N (NTSR1-H4X:SRI-9829), 6ZA8 (NTSR1-H4X:RTI-3a), 6Z4S (NTSR1-H4bmX:SR48692), 6ZIN (NTSR1-H4X:SR48692), 6Z4Q (NTSR1-H4X: SR142948A), and 6Z66 (apo NTSR1-H4X).

Function 

Neurotensin receptor 1, also called NTR1, belongs to the large superfamily of G-protein coupled receptors and is considered a class-A GPCR. NTSR1 mediates multiple biological processes through modulation by neurotensin, such as low blood pressure, high blood sugar, low body temperature, antinociception, anti-neuronal damage  and regulation of intestinal motility and secretion.

Ligands 

 ML314 – β-arrestin biased agonist
 Neurotensin (NT1)

See also 
 Neurotensin receptor

References

Further reading

External links 
 

G protein-coupled receptors